TV 2 (TV to) is a Norwegian terrestrial television channel. Its headquarters are located in Bergen. TV 2 began test broadcasting on 13 November 1991, and a year later, it was officially launched on 5 September 1992, becoming Norway's first commercial free-to-air television channel. In 1992, TV 2 A/S was admitted as full active member of the European Broadcasting Union.

As is common with television (and cinema) in Norway, most foreign-language shows and segments of local programmes with foreign language dialogues (e.g. interviews with foreigners) are subtitled in Norwegian, not dubbed (with a notable exception being children's programmes). Since 2012, TV 2 is owned by one of its co-founders, the Danish media company Egmont Group.

History 
In 1990, the Storting opened the way for an advertising-financed alternative to NRK to be established. The license was announced on 31 January 1991, with the requirement that no owner could own more than 20 per cent of the shares in the channel. There were many interested parties for the concession, and among others Schibsted, Egmont, Orkla, a grouping around Rolf Wesenlund and Arne Fjørtoft and an investor group called NTN went with plans to apply for the license. The license as won by TV 2 AS in 1991. The company was a consortium owned by Schibsted, Vital Forsikring, Gutenberghus, NTN, Selvaag, Bergens Tidende and Sissel Ditlevsen.

TV 2 had its official start on 5 September 1992 with the show For første gang (For the First Time), led by Dan Børge Akerø. The show was a simulcast with NRK, and was seen by 1.7 million viewers.

Normal broadcasts started the following day with the broadcast of an elite series match between Viking and Rosenborg, a concert with the Oslo Gospel Choir in addition to news, sports and a documentary. In addition, the American series Flipper and Et vilt liv had been given a place on the broadcast schedule.

In the first week on the channel, viewers saw premieres of the channel's own productions such as VTV, Askeladden and Holmgang, in addition to foreign series such as Cheers, The Naked Gun and A Country Practice.

TV 2 HD 
TV 2 started broadcasting in high-definition on 25 June 2009. Initially, the channel was only available on the terrestrial RiksTV platform. The first programme broadcast in HD was Allsang på grensen. Other broadcasts in HD during 2009 include Tour de France, Friday and Saturday movies, Sunday night football, Jakten på kjærligheten, Skal vi danse and American series such as Grey's Anatomy, Cleaners, Scrubs, Brothers & Sisters, Modern Family and Criminal Minds. TV2 also produces original programming, including the award-winning show Gylne tider.

TV 2 HD is transmitted in 720p50.

Logos

Distribution 
Although TV 2 is a terrestrial channel, a paid subscription with RiksTV is required to view the channel in that manner.  The channel is also available on cable, satellite, and IPTV platforms nationwide as well as selected pay-TV platforms in neighbouring Sweden and Denmark.

See also 
 List of Norwegian television channels
 List of programmes broadcast by TV 2 (Norway)
 TV 2 Nyhetene

References

External links 

 
 Television schedule
 

 
Television channels in Norway
Television channels and stations established in 1992
Television channels and stations established in 1991
1991 establishments in Norway
1992 establishments in Norway
Mass media in Bergen
European Broadcasting Union members